The Satisfaction with Life Index was created in 2007 by Adrian G. White, an analytic social psychologist at the University of Leicester, using data from a metastudy. It is an attempt to show life satisfaction in different nations.

In this calculation, subjective well-being correlates most strongly with health (.7), wealth (.6), and access to basic education (.6).

This is an example of directly measuring happiness—asking people how happy they are—as an alternative to traditional measures of policy success such as GDP or GNP.  Some studies suggest that happiness can be measured effectively.

This Index, however, is not solely based on directly asking "how people feel", but also on its social and economic development.

The Happy Planet Index was used along with data from UNESCO on access to schooling, from the WHO on life expectancy, and from the CIA on GDP per capita to perform a new analysis with this data to come to a unique and novel set of results. Specifically, the extent of correlation between measures of poverty, health and education, and the variable of happiness.

Satisfaction Index
The subjective well-being index represents the overall satisfaction level as one number.

Analysed data to create the index comes from UNESCO, the CIA, the New Economics Foundation, the WHO, the Veenhoven Database, the Latinbarometer, the Afrobarometer, and the UNHDR. These sources are analysed to create a global projection of subjective well-being: the first world map of happiness.
Whilst collecting data on subjective well-being is not an exact science, the measures used are very reliable in predicting health and welfare outcomes.

International rankings 2007-2017

See also 
 Social Progress Index
 Happy Planet Index
 Human Development Index
 List of countries by Human Development Index
 Quality of life
 Gross National Happiness

References

Happiness indices